Eressa furva is a moth of the family Erebidae. It was described by George Hampson in 1898. It is found in Sri Lanka and on Buru.

Subspecies
Eressa furva furva
Eressa furva buruana van Eecke, 1929 (Buru)

References

 

Eressa
Moths described in 1898